Acupalpus flaviceps is an insect-eating ground beetle of the genus Acupalpus.

flaviceps